= Monte Roncalla =

Mountain in Italy

- Location within Italy

Highest point
- Elevation: 1,658 m (5,440 ft)
- Prominence: 103 m (338 ft)
- Coordinates: 44°33′54″N 9°28′09″E

Geography
- Location: Liguria/Emilia-Romagna, Italy
- Parent range: Ligurian Apennines

Monte Roncalla is a mountain in Liguria, northern Italy, part of the Ligurian Apennines.
